The following is an overview of 1930 in film, including significant events, a list of films released and notable births and deaths.

Top-grossing films (U.S.)
The top ten 1930 released films by box office gross in North America are as follows:

Events
 February 21: Anna Christie, Greta Garbo's first sound film is released, it grosses $1.5 million.
 February 23: Silent screen legend Mabel Normand dies at the age of 37 in Monrovia, California after a lengthy battle with tuberculosis.
 March 10: Release of Goodbye Argentina (Adiós Argentina), the first Argentine film with a (musical) soundtrack. Ada Cornaro has her first starring role and Libertad Lamarque makes her film debut. 
 April 6: William Fox sells his interest in Fox Film for $18 million and Harley L. Clarke becomes president.
 May 27: Howard Hughes' epic film Hell's Angels premieres at Grauman's Chinese Theatre in Hollywood and features Jean Harlow in her first major role as well as some impressive aerial sequences. Although not a financial success upon its release due to its bloated budget, the film is acclaimed by critics and launches Harlow as one of the 1930s' biggest stars.
 August 9: Cartoon character Betty Boop appears for the first time on screen, in the animated film Dizzy Dishes.
 September 3: The Hollywood Reporter is first published.
 September 19: The Love Parade receives a record six Academy Award nominations.
 November 1: The Big Trail featuring a young John Wayne in his first starring role is released in both 35mm and a very early form of 70mm film. It is the first large scale big-budget film of the sound era, costing over $2 million. The film is praised for its aesthetic quality and realism that will not become commonplace until many decades later. However, due to the new film format and the film's release during the Great Depression, the film will go on to become a financial failure at the box office.

Academy Awards

Best Picture: All Quiet on the Western Front – Universal Pictures
Best Director: Lewis Milestone – All Quiet on the Western Front
Best Actor: George Arliss – Disraeli
Best Actress: Norma Shearer – The Divorcee

Notable films released in 1930
United States unless stated

A
Abi and Rabi, starring and directed by Ovanes Ohanian – (Iran)
Abraham Lincoln, directed by D. W. Griffith, starring Walter Huston and Una Merkel
L'Âge d'Or (The Golden Age), directed by Luis Buñuel – (France)
All Quiet on the Western Front, directed by Lewis Milestone, starring Lew Ayres and Louis Wolheim
Alraune, directed by Richard Oswald – (Germany)
Animal Crackers, directed by Victor Heerman, starring the Marx Brothers
Anna Christie, directed by Clarence Brown, starring Greta Garbo
The Arizona Kid, directed by Alfred Santell, starring Warner Baxter and Carole Lombard

B
The Bad Man, directed by Clarence G. Badger, starring Walter Huston
The Bat Whispers, directed by Roland West, starring Chester Morris and Una Merkel
The Benson Murder Case, directed by Frank Tuttle, starring William Powell
Big Boy, directed by Alan Crosland, starring Al Jolson
The Big House, directed by George Hill, starring Chester Morris, Wallace Beery, Lewis Stone and Robert Montgomery
The Big Pond, directed by Hobart Henley, starring Maurice Chevalier and Claudette Colbert
The Big Trail, directed by Raoul Walsh, starring John Wayne
Billy the Kid, directed by King Vidor, starring Johnny Mack Brown and Wallace Beery
Der blaue Engel (The Blue Angel), directed by Josef von Sternberg, starring Marlene Dietrich and Emil Jannings – (Germany)
The Blood of a Poet (Le Sang d'un Poète), directed by Jean Cocteau – (France)
Borderline, directed by Kenneth Macpherson, starring Paul Robeson – (GB)
Bride of the Regiment (lost), directed by John Francis Dillon, starring Walter Pidgeon
Bright Lights, directed by Michael Curtiz

C
Call of the Flesh, directed by Charles Brabin, starring Ramón Novarro
The Cat Creeps (lost), directed by Rupert Julian, starring Helen Twelvetrees
Chasing Rainbows, directed by Charles Reisner, starring Charles King, Bessie Love, Jack Benny and Marie Dressler
Check and Double Check, directed by Melville W. Brown, starring Amos 'n' Andy
Children of Pleasure, directed by Harry Beaumont
City Girl, directed by F. W. Murnau, starring Mary Duncan and Charles Farrell
Common Clay (lost), directed by Victor Fleming, starring Constance Bennett and Lew Ayres
The Cuckoos, directed by Paul Sloane, starring Wheeler & Woolsey

D
Danger Lights, directed by George B. Seitz, starring Louis Wolheim, Robert Armstrong and Jean Arthur
The Dawn Patrol, directed by Howard Hawks, starring Richard Barthelmess, Douglas Fairbanks Jr. and Neil Hamilton
The Devil to Pay!, directed by George Fitzmaurice, starring Ronald Colman, Loretta Young and Myrna Loy
The Divorcee, directed by Robert Z. Leonard, starring Norma Shearer, Chester Morris, Conrad Nagel and Robert Montgomery
Dixiana, directed by Luther Reed, starring Bebe Daniels and Wheeler & Woolsey
Doughboys, directed by Edward Sedgwick, starring Buster Keaton and Cliff Edwards

E
Earth (Zemlya), directed by Alexander Dovzhenko – (U.S.S.R.)
Elstree Calling, directed by Adrian Brunel and Alfred Hitchcock – (GB)
Escape!, directed by Basil Dean, starring Gerald du Maurier and Edna Best – (GB)

F
Fast and Loose, directed by Fred C. Newmeyer, starring Miriam Hopkins, Carole Lombard and Frank Morgan
Feet First, directed by Clyde Bruckman, starring Harold Lloyd
The Florodora Girl, directed by Harry Beaumont, starring Marion Davies
The Flute Concert of Sanssouci (Das Flötenkonzert von Sans-souci), directed by Gustav Ucicky, starring Otto Gebühr – (Germany)
Follow Thru, directed by Laurence Schwab and Lloyd Corrigan, starring Charles 'Buddy' Rogers
Free and Easy, directed by Edward Sedgwick, starring Buster Keaton, Anita Page and Robert Montgomery

G
The Girl Said No, directed by Sam Wood, starring William Haines, Leila Hyams and Marie Dressler
Good News, directed by Nick Grinde, starring Bessie Love and Cliff Edwards

H
Hell's Angels, directed by Howard Hughes, starring Jean Harlow and Ben Lyon
Her Man, directed by Tay Garnett, starring Helen Twelvetrees
High Society Blues, directed by David Butler, starring Janet Gaynor and Charles Farrell
Hold Everything (lost), directed by Roy Del Ruth, starring Joe E. Brown
Holiday, directed by Edward H. Griffith, starring Ann Harding and Mary Astor

I
Imperial and Royal Field Marshal (C. a k. polní maršálek), directed by Karel Lamač – (Czechoslovakia)
Ingagi, directed by William S. Campbell

J
Journey's End, directed by James Whale, starring Colin Clive – (GB/US)
Just Imagine, directed by David Butler

K
King of Jazz, directed by John Murray Anderson, starring Paul Whiteman, John Boles and Laura La Plante

L
Ladies Love Brutes, directed by Rowland V. Lee, starring George Bancroft, Mary Astor and Fredric March
Ladies of Leisure, directed by Frank Capra, starring Barbara Stanwyck
A Lady to Love, directed by Victor Sjöström, starring Vilma Bánky and Edward G. Robinson
Leathernecking, directed by Edward F. Cline, starring Irene Dunne
Let's Go Native, directed by Leo McCarey, starring Jack Oakie and Jeanette MacDonald
Liliom, directed by Frank Borzage, starring Charles Farrell and Rose Hobart
Lightnin', directed by Henry King, starring Will Rogers, Louise Dresser and Joel McCrea
Loose Ankles, directed by Ted Wilde, starring Loretta Young and Douglas Fairbanks Jr.
Lord Byron of Broadway, directed by Harry Beaumont and William Nigh
The Lottery Bride, directed by Paul L. Stein, starring Jeanette MacDonald, Joe E. Brown and ZaSu Pitts

M
Madam Satan, directed by Cecil B. DeMille, starring Kay Johnson
Mamba, directed by Albert S. Rogell, starring Jean Hersholt and Eleanor Boardman
Mammy, directed by Michael Curtiz, starring Al Jolson
The Man from Blankley's (lost), directed by Alfred E. Green, starring John Barrymore and Loretta Young
A Man from Wyoming, directed by Rowland V. Lee, starring Gary Cooper
Manslaughter, directed by George Abbott, starring Claudette Colbert and Fredric March
Min and Bill, directed by George Hill, starring Marie Dressler and Wallace Beery
Montana Moon, directed by Malcolm St. Clair, starring Joan Crawford and Johnny Mack Brown 
Monte Carlo, directed by Ernst Lubitsch, starring Jack Buchanan and Jeanette MacDonald
Morocco, directed by Josef von Sternberg, starring Gary Cooper, Marlene Dietrich and Adolphe Menjou
Murder!, directed by Alfred Hitchcock, starring Herbert Marshall – (GB)
 (Le Mystère de la chambre jaune), directed by Marcel L'Herbier – (France)

N
Nerone (lost), directed by Alessandro Blasetti, starring Ettore Petrolini – (Italy)
Night Birds, directed by Richard Eichberg – (Germany/GB)
Not So Dumb, directed by King Vidor, starring Marion Davies

O
The Other (Der Andere), directed by Robert Wiene – (Germany)
Outside the Law, directed by Tod Browning, starring Edward G. Robinson and Mary Nolan

P
Paid, directed by Sam Wood, starring Joan Crawford, Robert Armstrong and Marie Prevost
Paramount on Parade, an all-star revue
Peacock Alley, directed by Marcel de Sano, starring Mae Murray
People on Sunday (Menschen am Sonntag), directed by Robert Siodmak and Edgar G. Ulmer – (Germany)
Prix de Beauté (Beauty Prize), directed by Augusto Genina, starring Louise Brooks – (France)
Puttin' On the Ritz, directed by Edward Sloman, starring Harry Richman and Joan Bennett

Q
Queen High, directed by Fred C. Newmeyer, starring Charles Ruggles, Frank Morgan, and Ginger Rogers

R
Raffles, directed by George Fitzmaurice, starring Ronald Colman and Kay Francis
Reaching for the Moon, directed by Edmund Goulding, starring Douglas Fairbanks and Bebe Daniels
Renegades, directed by Victor Fleming, starring Warner Baxter, Myrna Loy and Noah Beery Sr.
The Return of Dr. Fu Manchu, directed by Rowland V. Lee, starring Warner Oland, Jean Arthur and Neil Hamilton
The Rogue Song (lost), directed by Lionel Barrymore, starring Lawrence Tibbett
The Royal Family of Broadway, directed by George Cukor and Cyril Gardner, starring Fredric March and Mary Brian

S
Show Girl in Hollywood, directed by Mervyn LeRoy, starring Alice White
Son of the Gods,,directed by Frank Lloyd. starring Richard Barthelmess and Constance Bennett
Song o' My Heart, directed by Frank Borzage, starring John McCormack
The Song of Love (La canzone dell'amore), directed by Gennaro Righelli – (Italy)
Soup to Nuts, directed by Benjamin Stoloff, starring Ted Healy and His Stooges
Spring Is Here, directed by John Francis Dillon
St. Jorgen's Day (Prazdnik svyatogo Yorgena), directed by Yakov Protazanov – (U.S.S.R.)
Street of Chance, directed by John Cromwell, starring William Powell, Jean Arthur and Kay Francis
Sweet Kitty Bellairs, directed by Alfred E. Green, starring Claudia Dell and Walter Pidgeon

T
Tarakanova, directed by Raymond Bernard – (France)
The Temporary Widow, directed by Gustav Ucicky, starring Lilian Harvey and Laurence Olivier – (GB/Germany)
Three Faces East, directed by Roy Del Ruth, starring Constance Bennett and Erich von Stroheim 
The Three from the Filling Station (Die Drei von der Tankstelle), directed by Wilhelm Thiele, starring Lilian Harvey and Willy Fritsch – (Germany)
Tom Sawyer, directed by John Cromwell, starring Jackie Coogan
True to the Navy, directed by Frank Tuttle, starring Clara Bow and Fredric March
Two Hearts in Waltz Time (Zwei Herzen im 3/4 Takt), directed by Géza von Bolváry – (Germany)

U
Under a Texas Moon, directed by Michael Curtiz
Under the Roofs of Paris (Sous les toits de Paris), directed by René Clair – (France)
The Unholy Three, directed by Jack Conway, starring Lon Chaney and Lila Lee

V
The Vagabond King, directed by Ludwig Berger, starring Dennis King and Jeanette MacDonald
Viejo smoking (Old Smoking Jacket), directed by Eduardo Morera – (Argentina)

W
The W Plan, directed by Victor Saville, starring Brian Aherne and Madeleine Carroll – (GB)
Wara Wara, directed by José Maria Velasco Maidana – (Bolivia)
Way for a Sailor, directed by Sam Wood, starring John Gilbert, Wallace Beery and Leila Hyams
Westfront 1918 (Vier von der Infanterie), directed by G. W. Pabst – (Germany)
Whoopee!, directed by Thornton Freeland, starring Eddie Cantor

Y
Young Man of Manhattan, directed by Monta Bell, starring Claudette Colbert, Norman Foster, Charles Ruggles and Ginger Rogers
Young Woodley, directed by Thomas Bentley, starring Madeleine Carroll – (GB)

Serials
Across the World with Mr & Mrs Martin Johnson
Hunting Tigers in India
The Indians Are Coming
The Jade Box
The Lightning Express
The Lone Defender, starring Rin Tin Tin
Terry of the Times
The Voice from the Sky

Short film series
Buster Keaton (1917–1941)
Our Gang (1922–1944)
Laurel and Hardy (1921–1943)
 Another Fine Mess (28 min)
 Night Owls (21 min)
 Hog Wild (19 min)
 Laughing Gravy (21 min)
 Brats (21 min)
 Below Zero (20 min)
Crying for the Carolines (5 min)

Animated short film series
Felix the Cat (1919-1936)
 April Maze (7 min)
 Skulls and Sculls
 Hootchy Cootchy Parlais Vous 
Aesop's Film Fables (1921–1933)
Krazy Kat (1925–1940)
Mickey Mouse (1928–1953)
 Just Mickey (7 min)
 The Barnyard Concert (6 min)
 The Cactus Kid
 The Fire Fighters
 The Shindig
 The Chain Gang
 The Gorilla Mystery
 The Picnic
 Pioneer Days
 Oswald the Lucky Rabbit
Silly Symphonies
 Summer
 Autumn
 The Cannibal Capers
 Night
 Frolicking Fish
 Arctic Antics
 Midnight in a Toyshop
 Monkey Melodies
 Winter
 Playful Pan
Screen Songs (1929–1938)
 Prisoner's Song (8 min)
Talkartoons (1929–1932)
 Dizzy Dishes (first Betty Boop cartoon)
 Barnacle Bill (second Betty Boop cartoon)
Looney Tunes (1930–1969)
 Sinkin' in the Bathtub
 Congo Jazz
 Hold Anything
 The Booze Hangs High
 Box Car Blues
Flip the Frog (1930–1933)
 The Village Barber (7 min)
 Puddle Pranks (7 min)
 Cuckoo Murder Case (8 min)
 Little Orphan Willie
 Flying Fists (7 min)
Terrytoons (1930–1964)
Toby the Pup (1930–1931)
 The Museum
 Toby the Miner
 Toby the Fiddler
 Toby the Showman
 The Bug House
"Beary Bear" (1930–1949)
 "Experiment Gone Wrong"
 "Hickory's Hijinks"
 "Piano Problems"
 "Oh Deer!"
 "Bushy the Lion"
 "Trouble in Paris"

Births
January 3
Mara Corday, American showgirl, model and actress
Robert Loggia, American actor (died 2015) 
January 10 – Roy E. Disney, American film executive and Walt Disney's nephew (died 2009) 
January 11 – Rod Taylor, Australian actor (died 2015)
January 12 – Edgar Landsbury, British-born Irish-American producer
January 13 – Frances Sternhagen, American actress
January 19 – Tippi Hedren, American actress
January 20 – Henry Woolf, British actor (died 2021)
January 24 – Terence Bayler, New Zealand actor (died 2016)
January 29 – Benjamin Tatar, American actor (died 2012)
January 30 – Gene Hackman, American actor
February 6 – Allan King, Canadian director (died 2009)
February 10 – Robert Wagner, American actor
February 16 – Ricou Browning, American film director, actor, cinematographer and stuntman (died 2023)
February 20 – Patricia Smith, American actress (died 2011) 
February 24 – Barbara Lawrence, American actress, model (died 2013)
February 27 – Joanne Woodward, American actress
March 6 – Allison Hayes, American actress (died 1977)
March 12 – Scoey Mitchell, American actor, writer and director (died 2022)
March 13 – Harrison Young, American character actor (died 2005)
March 16 – Lotte Ledl, Austrian actress
March 21 – Pauline Stroud, British actress (died 2022)
March 24 – Steve McQueen, American actor (died 1980)
March 29 – Naser Malek Motiei, Iranian actor, director (died 2018)
March 30
John Astin, American actor
Estella Blain, French actress (died 1982)
April 1 – Grace Lee Whitney, American actress (died 2015)
April 5
Mary Costa, American singer and actress
Marietta Marich, American actress, singer, writer, stage director and television host (died 2017)
April 7 – Andrew Sachs, German-born British actor and writer (died 2016)
April 13 – Roger Browne, American actor
April 14 – Bradford Dillman, American actor (died 2018)
April 18 – Clive Revill, New Zealand actor
April 19 – Dick Sargent, American actor (died 1994)
April 21 – Silvana Mangano, Italian actress (died 1989)
April 23 – Alan Oppenheimer, American actor
April 24 – Richard Donner, American director and producer (died 2021)
April 25 – Paul Mazursky, American director and actor (died 2014)
April 28 – Carolyn Jones, American actress (died 1983)
April 29 - Jean Rochefort, French actor (died 2017)
May 4 – Lois de Banzie, Scottish-born American actress (died 2021)
May 5 – Will Hutchins, American actor
May 9 – Joan Sims, English actress (died 2001)
May 11 – Bud Ekins, American actor and stuntman (died 2007)
May 31 – Clint Eastwood, American actor, director and producer
June 1
Pat Corley, American actor (died 2006)
Edward Woodward, English actor and singer (died 2009)
June 4
Edward Kelsey, English actor (died 2019)
Morgana King, American jazz singer and actress (died 2018)
Bill Treacher, English actor (died 2022)
June 9 - Terry Norris (actor), Australian actor
June 15 – Odile Versois, French actress (died 1980)
June 19 
Gena Rowlands, American actress
Diana Sowle, American actress (died 2018) 
June 29 – Ariadna Welter, Mexican actress (died 1998)
July 5 - Tommy Cook (actor), American producer, screenwriter and actor
July 8 - Jerry Vale, American actor and singer (died 2014)
July 10
Bruce Boa, Canadian actor (died 2004)
Susan Cummings, German actress (died 2016)
July 12 - Gordon Pinsent, Canadian actor, writer, director and singer (died 2023)
July 18 – Burt Kwouk, British-Chinese actor (died 2016)
July 20 - Sally Ann Howes, English actress and singer (died 2021)
July 24 - Jacqueline Brookes, American actress (died 2013)
July 25 - Annie Ross, British-American singer and actress (died 2020)
July 28 - Alfie Curtis, British actor (died 2017)
July 30 - Tony Lip, American actor (died 2013)
August 1
Bill Allison (actor), American actor (died 2016)
Geoffrey Holder, Trinidadian-American actor and musician (died 2014)
August 5 - Joan Weldon, American actress, singer (died 2021)
August 11 - Paul Soles, Canadian actor (died 2021)
August 12 – Peter Weck, Austrian film director and actor
August 14 – Liz Fraser, English actress (died 2018)
August 25 – Sir Sean Connery, Scottish-born actor (died 2020)
August 28 - Ben Gazzara, American and director (died 2012)
September 16 – Anne Francis, American actress (died 2011)
September 17 - David Huddleston, American actor (died 2016)
September 21 – Dawn Addams, English actress (died 1985)
September 26 - Philip Bosco, American actor (died 2018)
October 1 – Richard Harris, Irish actor (died 2002)
October 5
Skip Homeier, American actor (died 2017)
Yuriy Yakovlev, Bulgarian actor (died 2002)
October 6 - Lou Cutell, American actor (died 2021)
October 8 - James Olson (actor), American actor (died 2022)
October 10 - Joan O'Hara, Irish actress (died 2007)
October 13 - Paul Kent (actor), American actor (died 2011)
October 23 – Gérard Blain, French actor and director (died 2000)
October 24 – Jack Angel, American voice actor and former radio personality (died 2021)
November 3 - Lois Smith, American character actress
November 5 - Joaquín Martínez, Mexican-born American actor (died 2012)
November 20 - Bernard Horsfall, English actor (died 2013)
November 23 - Robert Easton (actor), American actor (died 2011)
December 3 – Jean-Luc Godard, French director (died 2022)
December 9 – Francesco Maselli, Italian director
December 11 – Jean-Louis Trintignant, French actor (died 2022)
December 13 - Robert Prosky, American actor (died 2008)
December 17 – Armin Mueller-Stahl, German actor
December 20 - Noel Ferrier, Australian actor, television personality and producer (died 1997)

Deaths
January 31 – Dorothy Seastrom, American actress (born 1903)
February 23 – Mabel Normand, American actress (born 1892)
July 7 – Arthur Conan Doyle, British author and creator of Sherlock Holmes (born 1859)
August 26 – Lon Chaney, American actor (born 1883)
September 14 – Tommy Mintz, American actor, assistant director (born 1906)
September 15 – Milton Sills, American actor (born 1882)
November 8 – Clare Eames, American actress (born 1894)
December 15 – Diane Ellis, American actress (born 1909)

Film debuts
Pat O'Brien – Compliments of the Season
James Cagney – Sinners' Holiday
John Carradine – Bright Lights
Buster Crabbe – Good News
Bing Crosby – King of Jazz
Frances Dee – Playboy of Paris
Irene Dunne – Leathernecking
Jimmy Durante – Roadhouse Nights
Rex Harrison – The Great Game
Miriam Hopkins – Fast and Loose
Ruby Keeler – Show Girl in Hollywood
Hedy Lamarr – Money on the Street
Ethel Merman – Her Future
Laurence Olivier – The Temporary Widow
Eleanor Powell – Queen High
Penny Singleton – Good News
Maureen O'Sullivan – So This Is London
Spencer Tracy – The Strong Arm

References

 
Film by year